Xiuhcanahualtzin was a Princess of Azcapotzalco and Queen of Tlatelolco by marriage.

Family
She was a daughter of the king Tezozomoc and Tzihuacxochitzin and sister of the king Quaquapitzahuac. She married her nephew Tlacateotl, who was a successor of his father Quaquapitzahuac as the king of Tlatelolco. They had three children; one of them was Itzquauhtzin.

She was also a sister of the king Maxtla.

References

Nahua nobility
Indigenous Mexican women
Nobility of the Americas